Darren Duncan (born November 11, 1988) is an American professional basketball player who last played for the KW Titans of the National Basketball League of Canada (NBL).

Collegiate career 
Duncan attended Merrimack College in North Andover, Massachusetts and graduated in 2010. He was a finalist for the Bob Cousy Award as a junior. Other finalists included Stephen Curry, Jeff Teague, and Ty Lawson.

Professional career 
In his rookie season, Duncan led Raiffesen Dornbirn Lions to the Austrian Division II Basketball League championship. Averaging 25.5 points in the semifinals, he was named Finals Most Valuable Player and most notably recorded a game-winning shot in the Final Four round.

He also earned All-NBL Canada honors and won the 2014 NBL Canada Finals in the latter season.

On August 7, 2015, Duncan signed a one-year deal with Apollon Patras of the Greek Basket League. He left Apollon after appearing in seven games. On December 2, 2015, he signed with KTP Basket Kotka for the rest of the season.

On November 21, 2016, Duncan re-signed with Windsor Express.

References

External links 
 Agency profile
 
 Merrimack bio
 Darren Duncan at Eurobasket.com
 Darren Duncan at RealGM

1988 births
Living people
American expatriate basketball people in Austria
American expatriate basketball people in Canada
American expatriate basketball people in the Czech Republic
American expatriate basketball people in Finland
American expatriate basketball people in Greece
American men's basketball players
Apollon Patras B.C. players
Basketball players from New York City
BK NH Ostrava players
Halifax Rainmen players
KTP-Basket players
KW Titans players
Levharti Chomutov players
Merrimack Warriors men's basketball players
Point guards
Saint John Mill Rats players
Sportspeople from Queens, New York
Windsor Express players